Odette Giuffrida (born 12 October 1994 in Rome) is an Italian judoka. She competed at the 2015 World Judo Championships, where she placed fifth in the women's 52 kg.

Career
She competed at the 2016 Summer Olympics in Rio de Janeiro, in the women's 52 kg event, in which she won the silver medal.

Giuffrida recompeted again at the 2020 Summer Olympics held in Tokyo, Japan, in the women's 52 kg event, where she won the bronze medal against Réka Pupp of Hungary.

She won one of the bronze medals in her event at the 2022 Judo Grand Slam Tel Aviv held in Tel Aviv, Israel. She also won one of the bronze medals in her event at the 2022 Judo Grand Slam Antalya held in Antalya, Turkey.

See also
 Italy at the 2020 Summer Olympics

References

External links

 
 
 
 
 

1994 births
Living people
Sportspeople from Rome
Italian female judoka
Olympic judoka of Italy
Judoka at the 2016 Summer Olympics
Judoka at the 2020 Summer Olympics
Judoka at the 2010 Summer Youth Olympics
Olympic silver medalists for Italy
Olympic bronze medalists for Italy
Olympic medalists in judo
Medalists at the 2016 Summer Olympics
Medalists at the 2020 Summer Olympics
Mediterranean Games silver medalists for Italy
Mediterranean Games medalists in judo
Competitors at the 2018 Mediterranean Games
Judoka at the 2015 European Games
Judoka at the 2019 European Games
European Games medalists in judo
European Games bronze medalists for Italy
Judoka of Gruppo Sportivo Esercito
21st-century Italian women